Boxing County is a county of Binzhou in Shandong Province in the People's Republic of China.

History
The area of Boxing County was mostly created within the last few millennia and long remained sparsely populated owing to the destructive floods of the Yellow River.

In March 1956, Boxing absorbed most of the former , although Putai itself now forms the Pucheng area of Binzhou. Putai County had been established in 596.

Administrative divisions
As 2012, this County is divided to 3 subdistricts and 9 towns.
Subdistricts
 Chengdong Subdistrict
 Jinqiu Subdistrict
 Bochang Subdistrict

Towns

Climate

Transportation
 Zibo–Dongying Railway

Notes

References

External links
 Official website  

Counties of Shandong
Boxing County
Binzhou